The Société Libre des Beaux-Arts ("Free Society of Fine Arts") was an organization formed in 1868 by Belgian artists to react against academicism and to advance Realist painting and artistic freedom. Based in Brussels, the society was active until 1876, by which time the aesthetic values it espoused had infiltrated the official Salon. It played a formative role in establishing avant-gardism in Belgium.

History 
The first exhibition of the Free Society was held in 1868 to provide an alternative art space beyond the Salon. Three exhibitions were held in 1872. The society's manifesto was written by Camille van Camp and published 31 January, 1869. It promoted the "free and individual interpretation of nature" characteristic of Realist art, along with avant-garde concepts such as "struggle, change, freedom, progress, originality and tolerance."

The society published the periodicals L'Art Libre, a bi-monthly review (1871–72), and L'Art Universel (1873–76). In the first issue of L'Art Libre, they collectively asserted:

The goals of the Free Society were influenced by aesthetic ideals set forth by Gustave Courbet and the Barbizon artists and by the poet Charles Baudelaire. "Modernity" and "sincerity" were keywords. Official cultural critics were at first openly hostile. Two early champions, however, were the critics Camille Lemonnier, a member, who urged that they should "be of their own time," and Théo Hannon (1851-1916), who saw them as rebels against artificiality.

Membership 
A group portrait by society member Edmond Lambrichs shows the 16 artists of the original organizing committee. The society attracted in particular landscape painters working at the Atelier Saint-Luc of Brussels, also known as the Académie de Saint-Luc (ca. 1846–1864). Louis Dubois, Félicien Rops, Constantin Meunier and Louis Artan de Saint-Martin are considered leading members.

Most of the society's members had also belonged to the Artistic and Literary Circle of Brussels and the Royal Belgian Society of Watercolorists. After the society dissolved, several members joined groups such as La Chrysalide and Les XX.

List of original members

 Edouard Agneessens
 Louis Artan de Saint-Martin
 Alphonse Asselbergs
 Théodore Baron
 Antoine-Félix Bouré
 Paul Jean Clays
 Marie Collart-Henrotin
 Joseph Coosemans
 Charles de Groux
 Hippolyte de la Charlerie
 Louis Dubois
 Adrien-Joseph Heymans
 Edouard Huberti
 Edmond Lambrichs (1830-1887)
 Paul Lauters
 Camille Lemonnier
 Constantin Meunier
 
 Félicien Rops
 Eugène Smits
 Camille van Camp
 Henri Van der Hecht (1841-1901)
 Isidore Verheyden
 Alfred Verwee

The society expressed an internationalist desire by inviting Courbet, Corot, Charles-François Daubigny, Théodore Rousseau and Jean-François Millet to join as honorary members.

See also
 List of Belgian painters
 Les XX

References

Belgian culture
Belgian art
19th-century art groups
Belgian artist groups and collectives